Harry Sibson (15 July 1919 – 5 January 2010), was a wing forward who played for Aylestonians prior to being invited to join Leicester Tigers. Harry played 183 games for Tigers between 1947 and 1954, he was also club secretary and between 1981 and 1983 he was Leicester Tigers president. He was an official at the Tigers when a great many players came through the teams to England honours; Peter Wheeler, Clive Woodward, Paul Dodge, Dusty Hare, Les Cusworth, Dean Richards to name a few. He was affectionally known by the players as "The Scrimshanker", a reference to his insistence that there would be "no room for scrimshankers on the pitch today". Harry Sibson is also credited with the introduction of the new offside rule. Prior to this time wing forwards at that time needed only to keep behind the ball in the scrum. The press comment was "one thing would be to introduce new rules curbing the power of the wing forward. Sibson … showed us, particularly in the Cardiff match at Welford Road, just how well open play can be stifled…. holding Haydn Tanner in subjection in the 1947-8 campaign". Haydn Tanner was considered the best scrum half of his generation.

References

1919 births
2010 deaths
English rugby union players
Rugby union officials
Leicester Tigers players
Rugby union players from Leicester
Rugby union wing-forwards